Periopta is a genus of moths of the family Noctuidae. The genus was described by Turner in 1920.

Species
 Periopta ardescens Butler, 1884
 Periopta diversa Walker, [1865]

References

Agaristinae